The discography of Biffy Clyro, a Scottish alternative rock band from Kilmarnock, consists of nine studio albums, three live albums, seven compilations, one soundtrack, six extended plays (EPs), 43 singles, 37 music videos and six other appearances. Formed in 1995 by vocalist and guitarist Simon Neil, bassist James Johnston and drummer Ben Johnston, Biffy Clyro released their debut EP thekidswhopoptodaywillrocktomorrow in 2000 through Electric Honey, and later signed with Beggars Banquet Records. The band's debut full-length album Blackened Sky was released in 2002, reaching number 25 on the Scottish Albums Chart. The Vertigo of Bliss followed in 2003, with single "Questions and Answers" reaching the top ten of the Scottish Singles Chart. The band's third and final album on Beggars Banquet, Infinity Land, peaked at number 13 in Scotland. "Glitter and Trauma", "My Recovery Injection" and "Only One Word Comes to Mind" all reached the singles chart top ten.

After signing with 14th Floor Records, Biffy Clyro returned in 2007 with Puzzle, which topped the Scottish Albums Chart and reached number 2 in the UK. The album was certified platinum in the UK, and spawned three UK top-20 singles: "Saturday Superhouse", "Living Is a Problem Because Everything Dies", and "Folding Stars". After reaching number 1 with "Mountains" and "That Golden Rule", the band released Only Revolutions in 2009 which reached number 2 in Scotland, number 3 in the UK, and has since been certified double platinum in the UK. An additional four singles from Only Revolutions reached the Scottish Singles Chart top 20. In 2011, the group issued their first live album Revolutions: Live at Wembley, which reached number 4 in Scotland and number 9 in the UK.

The double album Opposites, released in 2013, was the band's first to top the UK Albums Chart, as well as reaching number 1 in Scotland. Similarities, a collection of B-sides from the Opposites singles, charted at number 23 in Scotland and number 28 in the UK. Biffy's seventh studio album Ellipsis followed in 2016, following its predecessor in topping the charts in both the UK and Scotland. Upon the album's release, ten of the album's 11 tracks charted on the UK Rock & Metal Singles Chart, including four in the top ten. In 2018, the group released the live acoustic album MTV Unplugged: Live at Roundhouse, London, which reached number 2 on the Scottish Albums Chart and number 4 on the UK Albums Chart. The following year they released Balance, Not Symmetry, the soundtrack to the film of the same name written in part by Neil, which debuted at number 8 in Scotland and number 36 on the UK Albums Chart.

Albums

Studio albums

Soundtracks

Live albums

Compilations

Extended plays

Singles

Other charted songs

Music videos

Other appearances

Notes

References

External links
Official discography
Biffy Clyro discography at AllMusic
Biffy Clyro discography at Discogs
Biffy Clyro discography at MusicBrainz

Biffy Clyro
Biffy Clyro
Discography